The badminton tournaments at the 2024 Summer Olympics in Paris are scheduled to run from 27 July to 5 August at Porte de la Chapelle Arena. A total of 172 badminton players, with an equal distribution between men and women, will compete across five medal events (two per gender and a mixed) at these Games, the exact same amount as those in the previous editions.

Qualification

172 badminton quota places, with an equal split between men and women, are available for Paris 2024; NOCs can enter a maximum of eight badminton players across five medal events (men's and women's singles; men's, women's, and mixed doubles). The host nation France reserves a spot each in the men's and women's singles to be officially awarded to its respective highest-ranked badminton player, while four places (two per gender) are entitled to the eligible NOCs interested to have badminton players compete for Paris 2024 under the Universality principle.
 
The remaining badminton players must undergo a direct qualifying process to secure a spot in their respective categories for Paris 2024 through the "Race to Paris" ranking list prepared by the Badminton World Federation. The qualification period commences on May 1, 2023, and will conclude on April 28, 2024, with the final eligibility list published two days after the deadline. 

NOCs may enter a maximum of two players each in the men's and women's singles if they are ranked within the top sixteen of the "Race to Paris" ranking list, respectively; otherwise, they will send a single player until the roster of thirty-eight is complete. Similar protocols also apply to the players competing in the doubles tournament as the NOCs could enter a maximum of two pairs if they are ranked in the top eight with the rest entitled to a single pair until the quota of sixteen is reached. Additional rules ensure that each category must feature a badminton player representing each of the five continental zones (Africa, Americas, Asia, Europe, and Oceania) and assign additional quota places if some players qualify for multiple events.

Competition schedule

Medal summary

Medal table

Medalists

See also
Badminton at the 2022 Asian Games
Badminton at the 2023 European Games
Badminton at the 2023 Pan American Games

References

Badminton at the 2024 Summer Olympics
2024
2024 Summer Olympics events
Summer Olympics
Badminton tournaments in France